"Boys Don't Cry" is a song by English rock band the Cure. It was released in the UK as a stand-alone single in June 1979, and was included as the title track on Boys Don't Cry, the American equivalent to Three Imaginary Boys.

History
Written by band members Michael Dempsey, Robert Smith and Lol Tolhurst, the lyrics tell the story of a man who has given up trying to regain the love that he has lost, and tries to disguise his true emotional state. In an interview with the NME, Smith stated:

In April 1986, it was re-released on under the title "New Voice · New Mix", in which the original track was remixed and the vocals re-recorded. The 7" mix of the new version has not appeared on any subsequent release by the Cure, but can be heard in the music video for "Boys Don't Cry". It was released to promote Standing on a Beach; however, the original version of the song appears on the album. The 12" version "New Voice · Club Mix" was included on the 2018 remastered Deluxe Edition of Mixed Up.

Music video
The video, released in 1986 to promote the "New Voice New Mix" re-recording, features three children, including voice actor Mark Heatley who mimes the song. Behind a curtain, Smith, Tolhurst and Dempsey (in his only appearance with the band since his 1979 departure), appear as the children's shadows, with red eyes. This effect was attained by painting their eyelids with fluorescent paint.

Legacy
The 1999 film Boys Don't Cry took its title from the song; a cover version, performed by Nathan Larson, was used as the title song for the film. The song has appeared in numerous other films, including The Wedding Singer, 50 First Dates, Starter for Ten, I Do, Nick and Norah's Infinite Playlist, Friends with Benefits (a cover version, performed by Grant-Lee Phillips, is used in the soundtrack of the film) and Me and You. The song also featured in the second season of the TV sitcom How I Met Your Mother. The post-grunge band Oleander covered the song on their 1999 album February Son.

In 2018, the song was the subject of an episode of the BBC Radio 4 series Soul Music. The programme featured an interview with Tolhurst about the history of the song.

In 2020, the song appeared during the episode "Fagan" of the Netflix show The Crown.

American band I Dont Know How But They Found Me released a cover of the song in November 2021 as part of the deluxe version of their album Razzmatazz.

The song was performed live for the 1000th time on December 13, 2022 at the OVO Arena in Wembley, London, England.

Track listings
7" vinyl
 "Boys Don't Cry" – 2:34
 "Plastic Passion" – 2:15

1986
7" vinyl
 "Boys Don't Cry" (New Voice · New Mix) – 2:38
 "Pill Box Tales" – 2:54

12" vinyl
 "Boys Don't Cry" (New Voice · Club Mix) – 5:31
 "Pill Box Tales" – 2:56
 "Do the Hansa" – 2:40

Personnel
 Michael Dempsey – bass guitar
 Robert Smith – vocals, electric guitars
 Lol Tolhurst – drums

Chart history

"Boys Don't Cry (New Voice · New Mix)"

Certifications

References

External links
 

1979 songs
1979 singles
1986 singles
The Cure songs
Songs written by Robert Smith (musician)
Songs written by Michael Dempsey
Songs written by Lol Tolhurst
Fiction Records singles
Jangle pop songs